The 1978 Liège–Bastogne–Liège was the 64th edition of the Liège–Bastogne–Liège cycle race and was held on 23 April 1978. The race started and finished in Liège. The race was won by Joseph Bruyère of the C&A team.

General classification

References

1978
1978 in Belgian sport
April 1978 sports events in Europe
1978 Super Prestige Pernod